Shirakiopsis trilocularis is a species of flowering plant in the family Euphorbiaceae. It is native to Tanzania.

References 

Hippomaneae
Flora of Tanzania
Taxonomy articles created by Polbot